The Turkey women's national under-18 and under-19 basketball team is the representative for Turkey in international basketball competitions, and it is formed and run by the Turkish Basketball Federation. The Turkey women's national under-18 basketball team represents Turkey at the FIBA Europe Under-18 Championship for Women and the Turkey women's national under-19 basketball team at the FIBA Under-19 World Championship for Women.

FIBA U18 Women's European Championship

FIBA Under-19 Women's World Cup

See also
 Men's
 Turkey Men's national basketball team
Turkey Men's national basketball team U20
Turkey Men's national basketball team U18 and U19
Turkey Men's national basketball team U16 and U17
Turkey Men's national 3x3 team
 Women's
Turkey Women's national basketball team
Turkey Women's national basketball team U20
Turkey Women's national basketball team U18 and U19
Turkey Women's national basketball team U16 and U17
Turkey Women's national 3x3 team

References

U
Women's national under-18 basketball teams
Women's national under-19 basketball teams
Women's U18 U19